The 2010–11 Edmonton Oilers season was the 32nd season of play for the National Hockey League franchise that was established on June 22, 1979, and 39th season of play including their play in the World Hockey Association.

The Oilers posted a regular season record of 25 wins, 45 losses, and 12 overtime/shootout losses for 62 points and last place in the 30 team league, failing to qualify for the Stanley Cup playoffs for the fifth consecutive season.

A documentary on the season was produced for TSN titled Oil Change.

Off-season
On June 22, Tom Renney was named as the head coach of the Oilers, with Pat Quinn moving on to the role of senior hockey advisor.
The Oilers earned the first overall pick in the 2010 NHL Entry Draft, via selection lottery. On June 25, 2010, the long-awaited anticipation and debates were finally settled when Edmonton selected Taylor Hall as their first-ever first overall pick.
On July 15, the Oilers announced the appointments of Kelly Buchberger (retaining the same position the season previous) and Steve Smith as the two assistant coaches to new head coach Tom Renney, as well as the appointment of Todd Nelson, head coach for American Hockey League affiliate, the Oklahoma City Barons.
On July 30, the Oilers announced Ralph Krueger as their associate coach, who replaces Wayne Fleming, who left to work with the Tampa Bay Lightning.

Regular season

Divisional standings

Conference standings

Playoffs
The Oilers were eliminated from playoffs contention on March 14, 2011, continuing their streak of missing the post-season since the 2005–06 season that would not be broken until the 2016–17 season.

Schedule and results

Pre-season

Regular season

Player statistics

Skaters

Goaltenders

†Denotes player spent time with another team before joining Oilers. Stats reflect time with Oilers only.
‡Traded mid-season. Stats reflect time with Oilers only.

Awards and records

Awards

Records

Milestones

Transactions 
The Oilers have been involved in the following transactions during the 2010–11 season.

Trades

Free agents acquired

Free agents lost

Lost via waivers

Player signings

Draft picks 
Edmonton's picks at the 2010 NHL Entry Draft in Los Angeles, California.

Farm teams 
 The Oilers are affiliated with the Oklahoma City Barons of the American Hockey League and the Stockton Thunder of the ECHL.

See also 
 2010–11 NHL season

References 

2010–11 in Canadian ice hockey by team
2010–11 NHL season by team
2010-11